Luther Peak is a peak  high, standing  southeast of Mount Peacock in the Admiralty Mountains and overlooking Edisto Inlet in northern Victoria Land, Antarctica.

References

Mountains of Victoria Land
Borchgrevink Coast